Grabków or Grąbków may refer to the following places:
Grabków, Łódź Voivodeship (central Poland)
Grabków, Końskie County in Świętokrzyskie Voivodeship (south-central Poland)
Grabków, Starachowice County in Świętokrzyskie Voivodeship (south-central Poland)
Grabków, Lubusz Voivodeship (west Poland)
Grąbków, Greater Poland Voivodeship (west-central Poland)